Harry Klugmann (born 28 October 1940, in Stolp, Germany (now Słupsk, Poland)) is a German equestrian and Olympic medalist. He was born in Stolp. He competed in eventing at the 1972 Summer Olympics in Munich, and won a bronze medal with the German team.

References

External links
 

1940 births
Living people
Sportspeople from Słupsk
German male equestrians
Olympic equestrians of West Germany
Olympic bronze medalists for West Germany
Equestrians at the 1972 Summer Olympics
Olympic medalists in equestrian
Medalists at the 1972 Summer Olympics